Esther Rivera Robles (born 30 July 1964 in Ciudad Obregón, Sonora) is a Mexican Paralympian athlete competing mainly in javelin events.

Robles was the gold medalist in the Women's F33/34/52/53 javelin in the 2004 Summer Paralympics in Athens.  She attempted to defend this title in Beijing in 2008 but was ultimately unsuccessful coming away with nothing.

At the 2007 Parapan American Games, Robles set the world record for the F53 class in javelin with a distance of 11.87 m.

References

External links
 profile on paralympic.org

1964 births
Living people
Paralympic athletes of Mexico
Sportspeople from Sonora
People from Ciudad Obregón
Mexican female javelin throwers
Athletes (track and field) at the 2004 Summer Paralympics
Athletes (track and field) at the 2008 Summer Paralympics
Paralympic gold medalists for Mexico
World record holders in Paralympic athletics
Medalists at the 2004 Summer Paralympics
Paralympic medalists in athletics (track and field)
Medalists at the 2007 Parapan American Games
Medalists at the 2011 Parapan American Games
Medalists at the 2015 Parapan American Games
21st-century Mexican women